Ioueldaob (sometimes spelled Eoueldaob) is a region in the Republic of Palau located south of the island of Babeldaob. It includes the islands within the State of Koror, the states of Peleliu and Angaur. It is a traditional division between the northern and the southern islands. Ioueldaob literally means "lower sea", while Babeldaob means "upper sea".

List of States in the Region 
Koror
Peleliu
Angaur

Regions of Oceania by country
Geography of Palau
Koror
Peleliu
Angaur